Argyripnus brocki, commonly known as Brock's bristle-mouth fish, is a species of ray-finned fish in the genus Argyripnus found in the Pacific Ocean.

Etymology
The fish is named in honor of Vernon E. Brock (1912–1971),  an ichthyologist/herpetologist, for his contributions to marine biology and his support of Struhsaker’s studies of the Hawaiian bathyal fishes.

References

Taxa named by Paul J. Struhsaker
Fish described in 1973
Sternoptychidae